This list is of the Treasures of Hōryū-ji at Tokyo National Museum.

Treasures

See also

 Cultural Properties of Japan
 National Treasures of Japan

External links
  The Gallery of Horyuji Treasures
  Horyuji Treasures

References

Cultural Properties of Japan
Japan history-related lists
Hōryū-ji